Robert William Chase (1852–1927) was a British ornithologist, businessman, and philanthropist. His extensive collection of taxidermied birds is now in the care of Birmingham Museums Trust.

Chase owned a brush-making business in Birmingham. He was elected to the British Ornithologists' Union in 1882.

He was also vice-chairman of the board of governors of Birmingham Blue Coat School. He was treasurer (1892-1894 ) and president (1885-1886, 1899, 1905-1907) of the Birmingham Natural History and Philosophical Society, and in 1885 president of the Midland Union of Natural History Societies.

In 1892 his address was given as "Southfield, Priory Road, Birmingham".

References 

1852 births
1927 deaths
British ornithologists
British philanthropists
People from Edgbaston